Schläger  is a surname. Notable persons with that name include:

 Antonie Schläger (1859–1910), Austrian opera singer
 Hans Schläger (1820–1885), Austrian conductor and composer
 Marianne Schläger (born 1920), Austrian athlete

See also
 Schläger, a type of sword used in academic fencing
 Schlager (surname)

German-language surnames